Lara Mandić (born 23 April 1974) is Yugoslavian and Serbian former female basketball player.

References

1974 births
Living people
Sportspeople from Banja Luka
Serbs of Bosnia and Herzegovina
Serbian women's basketball players
Serbian expatriate basketball people in Spain
Serbian expatriate basketball people in Turkey
Serbian expatriate basketball people in France
Serbian expatriate basketball people in Hungary
Serbian expatriate basketball people in the Czech Republic
Yugoslav women's basketball players
Small forwards
ŽKK Crvena zvezda players
Beşiktaş women's basketball players
Ros Casares Valencia players
ŽKK Vršac players